Osipikha is a rural locality (a village) in Kubenskoye Rural Settlement, Kharovsky District, Vologda Oblast, Russia. The population was 11 as of 2002.

Geography 
Osipikha is located 11 km northwest of Kharovsk (the district's administrative centre) by road. Chernukhino is the nearest rural locality.

References 

Rural localities in Kharovsky District